This is a list of hospitals in Arizona (U.S. state). There are hospitals in all but one county of Arizona. The largest number of hospitals are in the Phoenix metropolitan area.

Hospitals 
The American Hospital Directory lists 124 hospitals in Arizona, which had a population of 7,278,717 in 2019.  In 2020, these hospitals had 13,296 staffed beds.  The largest hospitals, based on beds, is the Banner University Medical Center in Phoenix with 712 beds.  There is a hospital run by the Mayo Clinic in Phoenix.

Phoenix metropolitan area 
There are 52 hospitals in the Phoenix metropolitan area.

Hospitals outside of Phoenix
There are 44 other hospitals outside of the Phoenix metropolitan region.  Greenlee county does not have a hospital.

Tribally operated 638 health clinics
Tribally operated 638 health clinics include the following:

References 

 
Hospital
Arizona